See also Thiên Y A Na

Lady Po Nagar/Yan Po Nagar (杨婆那加), was the founder of the Cham people according to legends. According to the myth of Pô Nagar, she was born from the clouds of the sky and the foam of the sea. Her physical form was manifest in a piece of eaglewood floating on the waves of the ocean. She is also said to have had ninety-seven husbands and thirty-nine daughters who became goddesses like their mother. Pô Nagar was the goddess who created the earth, eaglewood and rice. It is told that there was even the aroma of rice in the air around her. The Chams looked upon her as a goddess of plants and trees. She was considered nurturing like the earth and she granted blessings to her followers.

See also
 Phosop
 Queen Soma

References

Kings of Champa
Legendary monarchs
Mythological queens
Legendary progenitors